The James San Jacinto Mountains Reserve, a unit of the University of California Natural Reserve System, is a  ecological reserve and biological field station located at an altitude of  in a wilderness area of the San Jacinto Mountains near Lake Fulmor in Riverside County, California, United States.

Overview
The James Reserve property was purchased in 1966 by the University of California, Riverside, from Harry and Grace James.

In addition to acting as a protected natural area for teaching and research in the sciences, it is also available as an engineering testing ground for various sensor-related and ecosystem monitoring technologies.

The primary research focus at the James Reserve has been ecological monitoring using ecological sensing systems. Over the internet, researchers, students and the interested public may unobtrusively visit and view nature via a webcam observatory, which includes an interactive robotic camera. Devices in the outdoor laboratory allow non-intrusive, around-the-clock monitoring.

The Director of the Reserve is Dr. Jennifer Gee, who received her Ph.D. from Princeton University, in the field of Ecology and Evolutionary Biology.

Access
Overnight accommodations for researchers and school groups may be made for the on-site Trailfinders Lodge. Visitation is by permission only.

See also
San Bernardino National Forest
Santa Rosa and San Jacinto Mountains National Monument
Santa Rosa Wilderness
Mojave and Colorado Deserts Biosphere Reserve

References

External links
 

University of California Natural Reserve System
Protected areas of Riverside County, California
San Jacinto Mountains
University of California, Riverside
1966 establishments in California
Protected areas established in 1966
Biological stations